Tarquinia Cathedral is a Roman Catholic cathedral in Tarquinia, Lazio, Italy, dedicated to Saint Margaret and Saint Martin. Formerly the episcopal seat of the Diocese of Tarquinia, previously known as the Diocese of Corneto, since 1986 it has been a co-cathedral of the Diocese of Civitavecchia-Tarquinia.

Roman Catholic cathedrals in Italy
 
Cathedrals in Lazio